The Football Team of the Century was chosen as part of the Gaelic Athletic Association's centenary year celebrations in 1984 to comprise, as a fifteen-member side divided as one goalkeeper, three half-backs, two midfielders, three half-forwards and three full-forwards, the best football players of the first one hundred years of the Gaelic Athletic Association.  The players on the team were nominated by Sunday Independent readers and were selected by a panel of experts and former players.

A team was also selected of players who had never won an All-Ireland.


References

Gaelic football awards
Team